Penicillium rubrum is a species of fungus in the genus Penicillium which produces kojic acid, mitorubrin, mitorubrinol, rubratoxin A, rubratoxin B rubralactone, rubramin  and occurs in grain corn and soybeans. Penicillium rubrum is similar to the species Penicillium chrysogenum.

Further reading

References 

rubrum
Fungi described in 1904